Muru Ningba or Meru Nyingba (rMe ru snying pa) (Tibetan: རྨེ་རུ་སྙིང་པ་) is a small Buddhist monastery located between the larger monasteries of Jokhang and Barkhor in the city of Lhasa, Tibet, China. It was the Lhasa seat of the former State Oracle who had his main residence at Nechung Monastery.

It is located immediately behind and east of the Jokhang and may be accessed from the north side of the Barkhor.

History
It is said that Emperor Songtsen Gampo built the first building here and it is where the great Tibetan scholar, Thonmi Sambhota, completed his work developing the Tibetan alphabet in the first half of the 7th century.

The present building, first constructed during the reign of King Ralpacan (c. 806-838 CE), is built like an Indian vihara around a courtyard, with the lhakang ('temple', literally 'residence of the deity') to the north and monks quarters on the three other sides.

It was destroyed during the persecution of Buddhism under Langdarma (c. 838 to 841 CE), but rebuilt by Atisha (980-1054 CE) and became Gelugpa under Sonam Gyatso, the 3rd Dalai Lama (1543–1589).

It became the Lhasa residence of the Nechung Oracle in the 17th century, who was possessed by Pehar in his trances.

Description
The lhakang contains a number of fine murals — the central image being that of Guru Rinpoche (Padmasambhava), with images of the five Nyingma Yidam-Protectors and Tseumar and Tamdrin in glass cases around the walls.

On the western side of the gallery upstairs is the Gongkar Chode Branch Temple, a Sakya shrine dedicated to an image of Gonpo Pelgon Dramtso or Bramze, the Sadhu-Protector of the monastery. His image is to the right of the door and used to be flanked by images of the six-armed Mahakala, Panjara and Shridevi.

The oldest extant structure is the Jambhala Lhakhang which was originally built under Ralpacan. It is quite small (7.5 x 7.2 metres), with a low ceiling. It is said to have been where Thonmi Sambhota worked on the alphabet and later became attached to Nechung.

The Dhukang or Assembly Hall, a very active temple, was built in the 19th century by Nechung Khenpo Sakya Ngape, and renovated in 1986. There are frescoes portraying the protector deity Dorje Drakden, Tsongkhapa, Atisha, Padmasambhava, Shantarakshita, and King Trisong Detsen. The central image of Avalokiteshvara is new with a copper Padmasambhava to the right and a sand mandala to the left. Behind is an inner sanctum with more images and upstairs is the Tsepame Lhakang with 1,000 small images of Amitayas (or Amitābha) Buddha.

Footnotes

References
 Dorje, Gyume (1999). Footprint Tibet Handbook with Bhutan. Footprint Handbooks, Bath, England. .
 Dowman, Keith (1998). The Power-Places of Central Tibet: The Pilgrim's Guide. Routledge & Kegan Paul, London and New York. .
 Vitali, Roberto (1990). Early Temples of Central Tibet. Serindia Publications, London. .

Buddhist monasteries in Lhasa
Buildings and structures in Lhasa
Chengguan District, Lhasa
Religion in Lhasa
Nyingma monasteries and temples